Auf deinen Schwingen is the seventh studio album from Austrian band L'Âme Immortelle.

Track listing

References

2006 albums
GUN Records albums